Stringari is a surname. Notable people with the surname include:

Martin Stringari (born 1971), Argentine tennis player
Sandro Stringari (born 1949), Italian theoretical physicist